Glenloth East is a locality in the Shire of Buloke and the Shire of Loddon, Victoria, Australia.

References